Lambula erema is a moth of the family Erebidae. It was described by Cyril Leslie Collenette in 1935. It is found on the Marquesas Archipelago.

References

 

Lithosiina
Moths described in 1935